The Secret Hour is a lost 1928 silent film romance drama directed by Rowland V. Lee and starring Pola Negri. It is based on the 1924 Broadway play, They Knew What They Wanted by Sidney Howard. It was produced by Paramount Famous Lasky Corporation and distributed through Paramount Pictures.

In 1956, the film entered the public domain in the United States because the claimants did not renew its copyright registration in the 28th year after publication.

Cast
Pola Negri - Amy
Jean Hersholt - Tony
Kenneth Thomson - Joe
Christian J. Frank - Sam
George Kuwa - Ah Gee
George Periolat - Doctor

See also
A Lady to Love (1930)
They Knew What They Wanted (1940)

References

External links
 

lobby posters and window cards

1928 films
American silent feature films
Lost American films
Films directed by Rowland V. Lee
American films based on plays
Paramount Pictures films
American romantic drama films
American black-and-white films
Lost romantic drama films
1928 lost films
1928 romantic drama films
1920s English-language films
1920s American films
Silent romantic drama films
Silent American drama films